Regents Theological College is a theological college in Malvern, Worcestershire, England. It is the training centre of the Elim Pentecostal Church.

First called Elim Bible College, it was founded in 1925 by the evangelist George Jeffreys, also co-founder and leader of Elim. Originally, it was situated in Clapham, London.  It later moved to Capel in Surrey, then to the former building of Willaston School, Nantwich, Cheshire in 1987. It became Regents Theological College in 1996.

In the early 1990s the college gained a more academic emphasis, mainly due to the work of American New Testament scholar Siegfried Schatzmann, then a faculty member. The college began offering undergraduate degrees validated by the University of Manchester. Undergraduate and postgraduate degrees are now validated by the University of Chester and doctoral supervision is now also offered in partnership with the University of Chester under the leadership of Dr. Martin Clay.

Although it still offers training for ministry in Elim, it accepts evangelical and charismatic Christians from a variety of Protestant denominations.

The college moved to its current site in September 2009.

The college building (St James' House)
St James' House was built c. 1860.

In c. 1890, the property was acquired by Lady Howard de Walden (née Lady Lucy Cavendish-Scott-Bentinck), widow of the 6th Baron Howard de Walden (who had died 1868) and daughter of the 4th Duke of Portland.

Lady Howard de Walden transformed the property (c. 1891) into a vast mansion, with water gardens.  Following her death (in 1899), it was sold to a family called Ballard who, in 1902, leased it to a Miss Alice Baird for use as a school for girls.  It remained the St James School for Girls until 2006.

The St. James School for Girls was one of a number of schools that merged with the former Malvern Girls' College, forming what is now called Malvern St James.  The West Malvern Road site was no longer required, and it was bought in 2007 by the Elim Pentecostal Church, who opened it as their training facility in 2009.

See also

George Jeffreys (pastor)
Elim Pentecostal Church
Malvern St James

External links
Regents Theological College Official website
Dr. Keith Warrington Homepage of ex-Regents lecturer and New Testament scholar

References

Bible colleges, seminaries and theological colleges in England
Elim Pentecostal Church